Foresthill High School is a high school in Foresthill, Placer County, California and is part of the Placer Union High School District, which is composed of five other high schools. Notable Alumni: Secret Clubhouse

Academic standing
As part of the California public school system, Foresthill participates in the various standardized testing and academic rankings.

Extra-curricular activities
The Foresthill Wildfire participate in most boys and girls sports in CIF Division VI, in the Central Valley California League (also referred to as the Central Valley Christian League as most of the schools in this league are private schools).

Notes and references

External links
 District website
 School website Main page
 

High schools in Placer County, California
Public high schools in California
2004 establishments in California